Peter Haase (born 23 January 1943) is a German sprinter. He competed in the men's 4 × 100 metres relay at the 1968 Summer Olympics representing East Germany.

References

1943 births
Living people
Athletes (track and field) at the 1968 Summer Olympics
East German male sprinters
Olympic athletes of East Germany
Place of birth missing (living people)